Hermine E. Kleinert (May 17, 1880 – July 28, 1943) was an American painter and artist.

Biography 
Kleinert lived and worked in New York City. She was also a member of the Woodstock art colony. Her landscape and portrait pieces were displayed at the Woodstock Artists Association Museum. Throughout her artistic career her work was featured in The Armory Show at 100, the Whitney Museum, and others. She was part of the Whitney's 3rd Biennial Exhibition of Contemporary American Painting in 1936. Her work was also part of a 20@th anniversary celebration of the Bezalel school of Arts and Crafts.

She died on July 28, 1943 in Woodstock. An art award in her memory, is given out annually on her birthdate, May 17.

References

1880 births
1943 deaths
20th-century American painters
American women painters
19th-century American painters
20th-century American women artists
19th-century American women artists
Painters from New York City